Mordellistena bicoloripes is a beetle in the genus Mordellistena of the family Mordellidae. It was described in 1937 by Píc.

References

bicoloripes
Beetles described in 1937